Wells Baptist Church is a historic Baptist church on Main Street in Wells, Hamilton County, New York. It sits on an uncoursed mortared rubble foundation and has a gable roof. The main facade features a tympanum surmounted by a louvered bell tower topped by a pyramidal roof.

It was added to the National Register of Historic Places in 1988.

References

Baptist churches in New York (state)
Churches on the National Register of Historic Places in New York (state)
Churches completed in 1845
19th-century Baptist churches in the United States
Churches in Hamilton County, New York
National Register of Historic Places in Hamilton County, New York